Philip John Clapp  (born March 11, 1971), best known professionally as Johnny Knoxville, is an American stunt performer, actor, writer, producer, and professional wrestler. He is best known as a co-creator and star of the MTV reality stunt show Jackass, which aired for three seasons from 2000 to 2001. A year later, Knoxville and his co-stars returned for the first installment in the Jackass film series, with a second and third installment being released in 2006 and 2010, respectively. Jackass Presents: Bad Grandpa (2013), the first film in the series with a storyline, saw him star as his Jackass character Irving Zisman. Jackass Forever was released in 2022, it is said to be his final installment of the Jackass franchise. 

Knoxville has had acting roles in films such as Men in Black II (2002), A Dirty Shame and Walking Tall (both 2004), The Dukes of Hazzard, The Ringer, and a cameo role as a sleazy corporate president of a skateboard company in Lords of Dogtown (all 2005), The Last Stand (2013), Skiptrace (2016), and the television series Reboot (2022). He also voiced Leonardo in Teenage Mutant Ninja Turtles (2014).

Early life
Knoxville was born Philip John Clapp ("P.J.") in Knoxville, Tennessee. His father, Philip (19352018), was a tire and car salesman, and his mother, Lemoyne Clapp (née Houck; 19382017), taught Sunday school. He has two older sisters.

Knoxville credits a copy of Jack Kerouac's On the Road, given to him by his cousin, singer-songwriter Roger Alan Wade, with giving him the acting bug.

Knoxville attended South-Doyle High School in Knoxville. While in high school, he played on the baseball team where he was named All-Knoxville Interscholastic League Honorable Mention and played in the Knoxville Area All Star game as a pitcher. After graduating in 1989, he moved to California to become an actor. In the beginning, Knoxville appeared mostly in commercials and made several minor appearances as an extra.

When the "big break" he sought eluded him, he decided to create his own opportunities by writing and pitching article ideas to various magazines. An idea to test self-defense equipment on himself captured the interest of Jeff Tremaine's skateboarding magazine Big Brother, and the stunts were filmed and included in Big Brother "Number Two" video.

Career

Knoxville is responsible for many of the ideas in Jackass, and is often seen as the de facto leader of the crew. The show is directed by Jeff Tremaine, who produced a pilot that used footage from Big Brother and Bam Margera's CKY videos.

With help from Tremaine's friend, film director Spike Jonze, they pitched a series to various networks. A deal was made with MTV and Jackass was born.

Knoxville also participated in the Gumball 3000 for Jackass along with co-stars Steve-O, Chris Pontius, Jackass director Jeff Tremaine, and cinematographer Dimitry Elyashkevich. Prior to Jackass premiering on MTV, Knoxville and company turned down an offer to perform their stunts for Saturday Night Live on a weekly basis, though Knoxville later hosted a 2005 episode of the show.

Film and television roles

Knoxville has been in several feature films, most notably starring opposite Seann William Scott in Jay Chandrasekhar's adaptation of The Dukes of Hazzard. He starred in Jackass: The Movie, Jackass Number Two, Jackass 2.5, Jackass 3D (which marked the 10th anniversary of the franchise), Jackass 3.5, Jackass Forever, and Jackass 4.5. He played a two-headed alien in the 2002 film Men in Black II. Knoxville also worked with John Waters in A Dirty Shame in 2004, and appeared as a supporting character to The Rock in Walking Tall in the same year.

He starred in Katrina Holden Bronson's Daltry Calhoun in 2005, and in The Ringer as an office worker who pretends to be disabled and joins the Special Olympics to pay for surgery for his office's janitor. He starred in the movie Lords of Dogtown as Topper Burks, made a minor appearance in the 2000 movie Coyote Ugly, and was featured as a guest voice on two episodes of King of the Hill.

Knoxville appeared in the John Madden-directed adaptation of Elmore Leonard's novel, Killshot, however, his character was subsequently removed from the final cut of the film. He guest-starred in a season 3 episode "Prank Wars" on Viva La Bam, in which he and Ryan Dunn trashed Bam Margera's Hummer and performed other pranks. He voiced himself in an episode of Family Guy. He co-produced The Dudesons in America and the now-canceled Nitro Circus on MTV.

In 2010, Knoxville hosted a three-part online video for Palladium Boots titled Detroit Lives. The videos focus on the resurgence of creativity in Detroit. Knoxville guest-starred as the voice of Johnny Krill, an extreme sports enthusiast, in "Extreme Spots", a 2012 episode of SpongeBob SquarePants. Knoxville voiced Leonardo in the 2014 film, Teenage Mutant Ninja Turtles but did not appear in the sequel.

Production credits

Knoxville has a production company called Dickhouse Productions, which he owns and operates with Jeff Tremaine and Spike Jonze of the Jackass franchise. Dickhouse's projects include The Birth of Big Air (2010), a documentary about Mat Hoffman that was part of ESPN's 30 for 30 series, and  The Wild and Wonderful Whites of West Virginia (2010), both of which have been picked up by Tribeca Films.

In May 2014, Knoxville (along with Jackass Executive Producer/H.M.F.I.C. Derek Freda) formally announced the formation of a new production company called 'Hello Junior', which will continue Knoxville's now-longstanding relationship with Paramount Pictures, who have signed an exclusive two-year first-look deal with Knoxville and 'Hello Junior' in the wake of the massive success of Bad Grandpa in late 2013.

Knoxville was quoted as saying, "I am over the damn moon about continuing an amazing partnership with Paramount Pictures," he said. "I have many more films to make and bones to break. I am glad I will be doing it for Paramount."

Professional wrestling
Knoxville, as with the Jackass crew, has been involved with the professional wrestling promotion WWE. On the October 13, 2008, episode of Raw, Knoxville made his WWE television debut feuding with The Great Khali. Knoxville later appeared as the guest star on the October 4, 2010, episode of Raw in Wichita, Kansas.

On January 1, 2022, at WWE's Day 1 pay-per-view, Knoxville announced he would be at the Royal Rumble pay-per-view as a participant in the event's signature namesake match. His entry was confirmed on the January 7 episode of SmackDown while simultaneously starting a feud with Sami Zayn. He entered the Royal Rumble at number 9 and was eliminated by Zayn. Knoxville then returned on the February 25 episode of SmackDown and challenged Zayn for the WWE Intercontinental Championship that the latter won the week prior, but Knoxville got rejected and was attacked by Zayn. The following week, Knoxville distracted Zayn during his match with Ricochet, allowing the latter to win the championship from him. Later that same night, Zayn challenged Knoxville to a match at WrestleMania 38 to which Knoxville accepted, and the match was stipulated as an Anything Goes match, wherein on Night 2 of that event, he won the match against Zayn with the help of Jackass members Chris Pontius, Wee Man, director Jeff Tremaine, and new members Jasper Dolphin and his father Compston "Dark Shark" Wilson.

Personal life
Knoxville married Melanie Lynn Cates on May 15, 1995. They have a daughter born on January 4, 1996. His daughter can be heard in the credits for Jackass Number Two, is seen in "The Making of Jackass Two" on the special features on the DVD, and was seen in the credits of Jackass 3D, punching Tremaine with a boxing glove. After eleven years of marriage, the couple separated in July 2006. Knoxville filed for divorce on July 3, 2007. The marriage was legally ended in March 2008, with final divorce arrangements settled in July 2009.

On February 4, 2009, Knoxville explained on The Howard Stern Show how he tore his urethra during a stunt for Jackass Presents: Mat Hoffman's Tribute to Evel Knievel, describing how he had to flush it twice daily. He said this was done by "sticking a tube into his penis all the way up to his bladder", referring to the practice of urinary catheterization. Knoxville said the process prevented scar tissue from forming and performed the procedure "twice a day for three and a half years" after the injury.

On August 18, 2009, Knoxville announced that he and his girlfriend, Naomi Nelson, were expecting their first child. Nelson gave birth to a son that December in Los Angeles. Knoxville and Nelson married on September 24, 2010. Nelson gave birth to a daughter in October 2011, in Los Angeles. On June 17, 2022, it was reported that Knoxville filed for divorce from his wife.

In December 2022, while filming The Prank Panel, Knoxville was sued by Khalil Khan, alleging that Khan was subjected to a "terrifying ordeal" after signing up for a handyman job on TaskRabbit in October.

Filmography

Feature films

Television

Video games

Music videos

Web series

References

External links

Official website
Official Jackass site

1971 births
Living people
Male actors from Tennessee
American male film actors
American male voice actors
American stunt performers
Jackass (TV series)
People from Knoxville, Tennessee